Kawfakha' was a Palestinian village located  east of Gaza that was depopulated during the 1948 Arab-Israeli war.

Location
The village stood on a stretch of sandy, rolling land in the northern Negev. A network of secondary roads linked it to the highways between Gaza and Julis, which ran parallel to the coastal highway.

History
Ceramics from the Byzantine era have been found here.

Ottoman era
In 1838,  in the late Ottoman era,   el-Kaufakhah was noted as a place "in ruins or deserted."

In 1882, the PEF's Survey of Western Palestine (SWP)  noted at Khurbet el Kofkhah: "a large site. Rubble  cisterns, a marble capital, with acanthus leaves. Scattered stones and pottery."

Kawfakwa was founded in the late nineteenth century by Gaza city residents who came to cultivate the surrounding land. In its center was a mosque that was well known in the region, built in the reign of the Ottoman sultan Abd al-Hamid II (1876–1909).

British mandate era
In the 1922 census of Palestine, conducted by the  British Mandate  authorities,  Kufakha had a population of 203 Muslims, increasing in the 1931 census  to 317, still all Muslims, in  56 houses.

The village had an elementary school and some small shops. The villagers obtained water for  domestic use from two wells inside the village. The land on the northern side of the village was planted with fruit trees, such as apricots, olives, almonds, grapes and figs. On the other sides of the village grain was grown.

In the 1945 statistics Kawfakha  had a population of 500  Muslims,  with a total of 8,569  dunams of land, according to an official land and population survey. Of this,  a total of 97 dunums was irrigated or used for orchards, and 7,768 dunums (of public land)  were allotted to cereals,  while 41 dunams were built-up, public land.

1948 and after
During the 1948 Arab-Israeli War, the villagers of Kawfakha repeatedly asked to surrender, accept Jewish rule and be allowed to stay, all to no avail. Kawfakha, together with al-Muharraqa, was raided by the Palmach's Negev Brigade on May 27–28, and the inhabitants of both villages were expelled or driven out. On May 30, a New York Times correspondent reported that the two villages had been captured.

Following the war the area was incorporated into the State of Israel and the moshav of Nir Akiva was established in 1953 on village lands, southwest of the village site.

According  to Khalidi, by 1992 the village remaining structures on the village land were:
"Only the mosque remains, and it is used as a storehouse for animal fodder and as a horse stable. It is a stone structure with arched entrances and windows on all sides; its roof is topped by three shallow domes. The site, which contains piles of rubble and is overgrown with cactuses and other desert plants, has been fenced in and serves as a pasture. There is a citrus grove west of it, and grain is grown by Israeli farmers on part of the surrounding land."

The village mosque was inspected in 1994, and found to be built of ashlar stones (approximately 0.2m x 0.4 m) with the corners emphasised by a slight offset. At the north-west corner there was a thick square minaret 10–15 meters high with chamfered corners. There are three doorways on the north side, two of which lead into the prayer hall, whilst the east door leads into a separate room. At the time of the inspection, the mosque was used as a storehouse for a nearby farm ("Avi´s Ranch").

See also
Depopulated Palestinian locations in Israel

References

Bibliography

External links
 Palestine Remembered - Kawfakha
 Kawfakha,  Zochrot
Survey of Western Palestine, Map 20:   IAA, Wikimedia commons 
Kawfakha from the Khalil Sakakini Cultural Center

Arab villages depopulated during the 1948 Arab–Israeli War
District of Gaza